The Price Formation is a geologic formation in Virginia. It preserves fossils dating back to the Carboniferous period.

Fossil content

Invertebrates

Eurypterids

Plants

See also

 List of fossiliferous stratigraphic units in Virginia
 Paleontology in Virginia

References

Geologic formations of Virginia
Geologic formations of West Virginia
Devonian geology of Virginia
Devonian West Virginia
Carboniferous geology of Virginia
Carboniferous West Virginia
Famennian Stage
Tournaisian
Carboniferous southern paleotropical deposits
Carboniferous southern paleotemperate deposits
Devonian southern paleotropical deposits
Devonian southern paleotemperate deposits